Strawberry Fields is a 1997 independent feature film directed by Japanese American filmmaker Rea Tajiri and co-written by Tajiri and Japanese Canadian author Kerri Sakamoto.

Plot
The story of the film centers on Irene Kawai, a Japanese American teenager in Chicago in the 1970s who is haunted by a photo of her grandfather she never knew standing by a barracks in a World War II internment camp for Japanese Americans. Prompted by visits from the ghost of Terri, her dead baby sister, Irene journeys with her boyfriend Luke on a road trip to Arizona, where the Poston War Relocation Center once stood, and where the photo of her grandfather was taken.

Main cast
 Suzy Nakamura as Irene Kawai
 James Sie as Luke
 Heather Yoshimura as Terri
 Marilyn Tokuda as Alice
 Reiko Mathieu as Aura
 Chris Tashima as Mark
 Takayo Fischer as Takayo
 Peter Yoshida as Bill

Production
Filmmaker Rea Tajiri, whose own grandparents and parents were interned, was inspired to make the project because of the lack of films that explored the effects of internment on internees' children. “I felt at the time I began the project that there hadn’t been any films made that looked at the effect the internment had on the children of internees,” said the New York City-based filmmaker...“What was that moment like when you discovered your family was interned and how does that affect you? How does that make you look at your family after that point?”Strawberry Fields was filmed in Chicago, Illinois, and in California. The film was completed in 1997, a process that took four years. It took another two years to get commercially released. The film received funding from CPB, NEA and ITVS.

Release
It premiered at the San Francisco International Asian American Film Festival and was an Official Selection to the Venice Film Festival. It also screened at the Los Angeles Film Festival and won the Grand Prix at the Fukuoka Asian Film Festival. It was released on VHS and DVD by Vanguard Cinema.

Reception
Critic Kevin Thomas of the Los Angeles Times called the film "very impressive...a tough-minded, idiosyncratic coming-of-age story". Variety was more critical, citing the film's "superficially sketched characters" and "hackneyed dialogue".

References

External links
 

1997 films
Films about Japanese Americans
Films about the internment of Japanese Americans
1990s ghost films
Films set in Poston, Arizona
Films set in Chicago
Films set in the 1970s
Films set in Arizona
American independent films
1997 independent films
Asian-American drama films
1990s English-language films
1990s American films